Reggae Rhythms was a Reggae radio station on Sirius Satellite Radio channel 97 and Dish Network channel 6097. Reggae Rhythms moved from channel 32 to channel 97 on February 14, 2007, and finally to channel 84 on June 24, 2008. It was replaced by The Joint as a result of the Sirius-XM merger. As of Aug 2022, The Joint can be found on channel 722.

See also
 List of Sirius Satellite Radio stations

External links
 Sirius Reggae Rhythms

Defunct radio stations in the United States